This is a list of seasons completed by the Milwaukee Mustangs. The Mustangs were a professional arena football franchise of the Arena Football League, based in Milwaukee, Wisconsin. The team was established in 1994. The Mustangs qualified for the playoffs four times, and had two winning seasons. The team folded after the completion of the 2001 season. They played their home games at Bradley Center.

References
 

Arena Football League seasons by team
Wisconsin sports-related lists
Milwaukee Mustangs (1994–2001)